Ratnayake Mudiyanselage Amara Piyaseeli Ratnayake is a Sri Lankan politician and was the 9th Governor of the North Western Province. She was a former member of the Parliament of Sri Lanka and a former government minister, being the Minister of Woman's affairs in the 2001-2004 United National Party government. She is a longstanding MP of the United National Party for the Wariyapola Electorate. She entered politics from Kurunegala after her husband's death.

References

Year of birth missing (living people)
Living people
Members of the 9th Parliament of Sri Lanka
Members of the 10th Parliament of Sri Lanka
Members of the 11th Parliament of Sri Lanka
Members of the 12th Parliament of Sri Lanka
Members of the 13th Parliament of Sri Lanka
United National Party politicians
Women legislators in Sri Lanka
Ministers of state of Sri Lanka
Non-cabinet ministers of Sri Lanka
20th-century Sri Lankan women politicians
21st-century Sri Lankan women politicians
Women government ministers of Sri Lanka